The Lodge is a British musical drama and mystery television series that premiered on Disney Channel in the United Kingdom on 23 September 2016 and on Disney Channel in the United States on 17 October 2016. The series is based on the Israeli series North Star and stars Sophie Simnett, Luke Newton, Thomas Doherty, Bethan Wright, Jayden Revri, Jade Alleyne, Joshua Sinclair-Evans, and Mia Jenkins.

Premise 
Fifteen-year-old Skye moves with her father Ed from the big city to rural Northern Ireland, where they take over a local hotel called North Star, which was previously owned and managed by Skye's grandfather Patrick. At their new home, Skye tries to build a life, but this new life is far from complication free as she must navigate through the everyday stresses of life as a teenager. When she discovers that her father is planning to sell the hotel to Gil, Skye becomes upset as she has developed an emotional attachment to it. Skye decides to convince her father not to sell the hotel only to discover that the man wanting to buy it is her new friend's father. Skye receives the support of her friends, but not everyone is as interested as she is in saving it. Skye discovers secrets over time that will affect not only her life, but that of the hotel.

Cast and characters

Main 
 Sophie Simnett as Skye Hart, a girl who moves to the North Star.
 Luke Newton as Ben Evans, a repairman at the North Star who enjoys the outdoors.
 Thomas Doherty as Sean Matthews, a worker at the North Star who enjoys mountain biking.
 Bethan Wright as Danielle Clark, Skye's frenemy, Sean's ex-girlfriend, and Ben's girlfriend.
 Jayden Revri as Noah Potts, a worker at the North Star who is a DJ.
 Jade Alleyne as Kaylee Markson, a worker at the North Star who plans to be a singer.
 Joshua Sinclair-Evans as Josh, Skye's friend from the city who she contacts for advice.
 Mia Jenkins as Alex, the cousin of Skye Hart who gets a job at the North Star. (series 2)

Recurring 
 Marcus Garvey as Ed Hart, the father of Skye.
 John Hopkins as Samuel "SJ" James, the uncle of Kyle and Aaron.
 Geoffrey McGivern as Patrick Hart, the grandfather of Skye and the original owner of the North Star.
 Dan Richardson as Gil Matthews, the father of Sean.
 Ellie Taylor as Christina, the director of the reality series My Amazing Life.
 Laila Rouass as Olivia Clark, the mother of Danielle.
 Dominic Harrison as Oz, a singer who is a temporary love interest for Kaylee.
 Tom Hudson as Kyle, the nephew of SJ.
 Martin Anzor as Aaron, the nephew of SJ.
 Sarah Nauta as Lori, a girl who worked for Christina. Nauta also voices her character in the Dutch dub of the series.
 Clara Rugaard as Ana, Ben's ex-girlfriend from Norway who befriends Danielle. Rugaard also voices her character in the Danish dub of the series.
 Cameron King as Ethan Evans, the younger brother of Ben who enjoys rock-climbing.
 Emma Campbell-Jones as Ella Matthews, the mother of Sean.
 Lina Larissa Strahl as Frankie, a student at Kaylee's music college.
 Kimberley Walsh as Rebecca, a music producer who encourages Frankie to steal Kaylee's song.
 Dove Cameron as Jess, Sean's friend who enjoys competitive biking.

Episodes

Series 1 (2016)

Series 2 (2017)

Production 
In July 2015, Disney Channel UK gave the green light for the production of the series The Lodge, which had the working title of North Star. For the first series, 13 episodes were originally announced, each with a running time of 22 minutes, though the amount was later reduced to 10 episodes. The main character, Skye, was originally named Maia, like in the Israeli Disney Channel original series North Star. The series The Lodge, filmed in Northern Ireland, takes place in the county of County Down. Most of the scenes are filmed in Montalto Estate and at The Carriage Rooms, which are in Ballynahinch.

On 13 December 2016, it was announced that the series was renewed for a second series, which premiered in 2017. On 21 February 2017, it was announced that production had begun on the second series and it would consist of 15 episodes.

The Lodge features the first coming out scene in a Disney Channel series: in a 2017 episode, Josh (Joshua Sinclair-Evans) mentions that girls aren't his type.

Music

Broadcast and release 
The pilot episode of The Lodge, "The New Girl", was released online in the UK on 8 September 2016, more than two weeks before its television premiere. The first series premiered in the United States on Disney Channel on 17 October 2016. At the end of 2016 and beginning of 2017, the series was released in 108 additional countries within the EMEA region. The series has since been made available on the streaming service Disney+.

Ratings

UK ratings 
 

| link2             = #Series 2 (2017)
| episodes2         = 15
| start2            = 
| end2              = 
| startrating2      = 0.14
| endrating2        = 0.10
| viewers2          = |2}} 
}}

U.S. ratings 
 
}}

References

External links 
 

2010s British children's television series
2010s British drama television series
2010s British mystery television series
2016 British television series debuts
2017 British television series endings
Disney Channel (British and Irish TV channel) original programming
British children's drama television series
British children's musical television series
British children's mystery television series
English-language television shows
Television series by Zodiak Media Group
Television shows set in Northern Ireland